Ennedi Ouest was a department of the former Borkou-Ennedi-Tibesti region in Chad. Its capital was Fada.

In 2008, the former Ennedi Ouest and Ennedi Est departments of Borkou-Ennedi-Tibesti became the new Ennedi Region. The city of Fada is now located in the new Ennedi department of the Ennedi region.

References 

Former departments of Chad
Ennedi-Ouest Region